The following events occurred in Antarctica in 2021.

Events 
Ongoing: COVID-19 pandemic in Antarctica

 March 18 - The Chilean Air Force announces that part of its staff in Antarctica has been vaccinated against COVID-19, making them the first people on the continent to receive a vaccine.
 May 19 - A tabular iceberg slightly larger than the size of Mallorca, dubbed A-76, calves from the Ronne Ice Shelf in Antarctica's Weddell Sea.
 July 1 - The United Nations' World Meteorological Organization confirms that a record high temperature of 18.3 °C (64.9 °F) has been recorded in Antarctica at the Esperanza Base.

References 

 
2020s in Antarctica
Years of the 21st century in Antarctica